Allen Davis can refer to:
Allen "Al" Davis (1929–2011), American football executive
Allen Bowie Davis (1809–1889), American businessman
George Allen Davis (1857–1920), American politician
Iron Davis (George Allen Davis, 1890–1961), American baseballer
Otis Davis (baseball) (Otis Allen Davis, 1920–2007), American baseballer
Stephen Allen Davis (active since 1967), American singer and songwriter
Allen Lee Davis (1944–1999), American executed murderer
Richard Allen Davis (born 1954), American murderer sentenced to death
Allen Davis, former member of American dream pop band The High Violets
Wade Davis (baseball) (Wade Allen Davis, born 1985), American baseballer
Raymond Allen Davis (born 1974), American former soldier charged with double murder in 2011 in the Raymond Allen Davis incident

See also
Al Davis (disambiguation)
Alan Davis (disambiguation)
Albert Davis (disambiguation)
Alan Davies (disambiguation)
Alun Davies (disambiguation)
Al Davies (disambiguation)